Plaumannimyia is a genus of tephritid  or fruit flies in the family Tephritidae.

Species
Plaumannimyia costaemaculata Hering, 1940
Plaumannimyia eugenia (Wulp, 1900)
Plaumannimyia pallens Hering, 1938

Distribution
Mexico, Guatemala, Brazil.

References

Tephritinae
Tephritidae genera
Diptera of South America
Diptera of North America